Steeve Barry (born 18 April 1991) is a French rugby seven back who competed at the 2016 Olympics.

References

External links 

 
 
 
 
 

1991 births
Living people
France international rugby sevens players
Olympic rugby sevens players of France
Rugby sevens players at the 2016 Summer Olympics